Ethmia nicholsonorum is a moth in the family Depressariidae. It is found in northern Costa Rica.

The ground color of the forewings is whitish with blackish markings and two distinct spots at the base, as well as two oblique irregular dark blotches directed 
to but unattached to an elongated mark line from the middle to the termen. The hindwing ground colour is whitish, but darker at the margins.

The larvae feed on Cordia panamensis.

Etymology
The species is named in honor of Ford and Catherine Nicholson for their support of Area de Conservación Guanacaste rain forest land purchase.

References

Moths described in 2014
nicholsonorum